The Fusiliers marins (lit. "Sailor Riflemen") are specialized French naval infantry trained for combat on land and coastal regions. The Fusiliers marins are also in charge of providing protection for naval vessels and key French Navy sites on land.

Missions 

The Fusiliers marins are tasked with:
 participating in land operations from the sea;
 participating in special operations (Commandos Marine);
 the protection of sensitive sites of the Navy (Naval bases, French Naval Aviation, transmission stations etc.);
 reinforcement of protection duties provided by Naval forces (maintaining order on board ship and the protection of naval vessels against attack).

The Fusiliers marins should not be confused with the Troupes de Marine of the modern French Army. The latter corps has undergone several changes in role from marine infantry to colonial troops (Troupes coloniales) to overseas forces. It has however remained as an essentially land force while the Fusiliers marins have throughout their history been an integral part of the French Navy.

History of the French Fusiliers Marins

Ancestors, Compagnies franches de la marine 

In 1627, Cardinal Richelieu undertook the creation of a Naval Regiment, intended to provide soldiers for service on naval ships. Their roles were to include combat on both land or sea, under the orders of the officers of the ship. These sea-going soldiers formed part of the ship's company and helped with its sailing. The basic units were the Compagnies franches de la marine: separate detachments of about 70 men, each commanded by a royal lieutenant des vaisseaux, supported by two ensigns. The marine companies served in the French colonies of the period and particularly in New France. These formations existed under differing titles until 1825, when they were dissolved by a royal ordinance decreeing that landing parties (compagnies de débarquement) be made up of sailors. The Régiments de la marine were subsequently succeeded by the Troupes de la marine, which later became the colonial troops (Troupes coloniales) of the French Army, specifically raised for overseas service.

Creation of a specialized corps in 1856 

These companies lacked specialized personnel trained for combat on land.

An Imperial decree dated 5 June 1856, created the Fusiliers marins, whose formation and training were undertaken by a battalion stationed at Lorient, Brittany. This specialized corps was put under the command of the captains and sergeants-at-arms of the various naval vessels of the French fleet, and was the direct ancestor of the modern Fusiliers.

Since that date, the Fusiliers have participated the following conflicts:

 The military colonial campaigns of the end of the 19th century,
 The expeditions in China, Cochinchina, Tonkin and Madagascar,
 The European conflicts in 1870, 1914-1918 and 1939-1945.

During the Franco-Prussian War of 1870, following the disaster of Sedan, several brigades of Fusiliers marins and naval artillerymen were engaged in combat at Bapaume and subsequently participated in the defense of Paris, notably at the Bourget and at L'Haÿ-les-Roses. This force formed part of the Government Armée versaillaise employed in the suppression of the Paris Commune in 1871.

A detachment of Fusiliers marins defended the French Legation (diplomatic mission) in Peking during the Boxer Rebellion of 1900. Amongst their officers was enseigne de vaisseau Paul Henry and Pierre Alexis Ronarc'h, who, in 1914, would serve as Counter-Admiral and Commandant of the Brigade de Fusiliers Marins BFM attached to the 32nd Army Corps.

The Brigade de Fusiliers marins distinguished themselves at Dixmude, on the Yser, at Longewaede, Hailles and Laffaux during the early stages of World War I. Three French ships have been named after Dixmude.

The Fusiliers marins participated in the campaigns of Free France. They initially formed a battalion then the 1er Régiment de Fusiliers Marins 1e RFM at the corps of the 1st Free French Division (1er DFL) and the 1er Bataillon de Fusiliers Marins Commandos (1er BFMC) who served in 10 (Inter-Allied) Commando. The 177 Commandos Kieffer who disembarked on 6 June in Normandy, were Fusiliers Marins forming part of the Free France Forces. Other Fusiliers Marins, drawn from the former Armée de Vichy, formed the Régiment Blindé de Fusiliers-Marins (RBFM) which served efficiently as part of the 2nd Armored Division. On 30 April 1945 the Fusiliers Marins played a role in the liberation of the Île d'Oléron. Disembarked at 0620 at Gatseau, an FM detachment advanced slowly through forested terrain facing a stern resistance.

In 1945, the Far Eastern Marine Brigade (BMEO) was created with the RBFM and the 1er RFM. Based on the request of general Leclerc, the Marine Brigade formed river brigades in 1945-1946. They became the Dinassaut, which operated in Tonkin and Cochinchina from 1947 to 1954. In 1956, with operational cadres serving in Algeria; the Demi-Brigade of Fusiliers Marins (DBFM) was created to play a leading role in securing the borders between Algeria and Morocco until 1962. This demi-brigade was under the command of Vessel Commander (CV) Ponchardier.

The modern French Fusiliers Marins are a specialised marine corps of the French Navy, similar to (for example) the Royal Marines of the Royal Navy, the Spanish Navy Marines (Spanish Navy), the San Marco Marine Brigade (Italian Navy), and the United States Marine Corps of the United States Navy.

Uniforms
The Naval Fusiliers wear a dark blue beret in their combat dress uniforms, pulled right with their own distinctive badge worn over the left eye or temple. Along with the Naval Commandos, they are unique among French forces in wearing the beret this way. When wearing regular dress uniforms, the sailor cap is used by junior ratings and the peaked cap by senior petty officers and officers.

Equipment

Weapons used

Assault Rifles
Famas G2 assault rifle

Sniper Rifles
HK G3-SG1
FR F2 sniper rifle

Shotguns
Valtro PM5 M2 shotgun

Pistols
HK Marine semi-automatic pistol

Non-lethal
Alsetex "Cougar" 56mm grenade launcher (used for riot control and other such purposes)
X26 Taser weapon

Machine Guns
Browning machine gun Cal.50 M-2HB
NF-1 machine gun

Rocket Launchers
AT4CS Anti-Tank Weapon

Inflatable boats
Zodiac Hurricane 630 IO EDOP
Zodiac Futura Mark II
Zodiac Futura Mark III

Ground vehicles
Light tactical vehicle Land Rover Defender 90 Td5
ACMAT VT 4

Notable fusilier marins

 Admiral Philippe de Gaulle, son of General Charles de Gaulle.
 Lieutenant Commander Henri de Pimodan, famous resistant, died in deportation.
 Lieutenant Commander Robert Detroyat, first commandant of the legendary 1st battalion of Fusilier Marins, died during operation Exporter in Syria (1941).
 Quarter-master Theo "Dudu" Dumas, a popular figure who appears in the film Taxi for Tobruk played by Lino Ventura.
 Quarter-master Constant Duclos, the first French soldier to execute a parachute jump on 17 November 1915.
 Lieutenant Georges Hébert, a pioneering French physical educator, theorist, and instructor.
 Sub-Lieutenant Paul Henry, fusilier marin officer, died defending the legation quarter of Peking (1900).
 Lieutenant Pierre Guillaume, a famous fusilier officer of the French Indochina war, inspired the character of the "Drummer Crab", the hero of the French movie Le Crabe-tambour.
 Actor Jean Gabin made his military service in the Fusiliers marins in 1924.

See also

FORFUSCO
Commandos Marine
List of active French Navy ships
List of ships of the line of France
List of submarines of France
List of Escorteurs of the French Navy
Sailors of the Imperial Guard

Notes

References
Fleury Georges, Les fusiliers marins de la France libre, Grasset, 1980,  or 978-2-246-09659-7. 
Major general USMC Paul J.Kennedy, Dinassaut Operations in Indochina: 1946-1954, 2001.
Contre-Amiral Robert Kilian, Les Fusiliers marins en Indochine : La Brigade marine du corps expéditionnaire d'Extrême-Orient, septembre 1945-mars 1947, Berger-Levrault, 1948.
Amiral La Roncière-Le Noury, La marine au siège de Paris, Plon, 1872.
Georges Le Bail, La Brigade des Jean le Gouin; Histoire documentaire et anecdotique des Fusiliers marins, Paris, 1917.
Adolphe Auguste Marie Lepotier, Les fusiliers marins, Editions France, 1962.
L’évolution des opérations amphibies, La Revue maritime, n° 198, avril 1963, p. 424.
Raymond Maggiar, Les fusiliers marins dans la division Leclerc, du débarquement en Normandie, en passant par Paris et Strasbourg jusqu'à Berchtesgaden, Paris : Albin Michel, 1947.
Jean Pinguet, Trois Etapes de la Brigade des Fusiliers Marins - La Marne, Gand, Dixmude, 1918.
Marcel Vigneras, Rearming the French, Office of the Chief of Military History, Dept. of the Army, US, 1957.

External links 

Présentation des fusiliers marins et commandos marine
'Dixmude' an Epic of the French Marines
The Play-Boys of Brittany Les Fusiliers Marins
DES DARDANELLES À NARVIK La réflexion sur les opérations combinées dans la marine française (1915-1940)
Ecole des fusiliers marins et Commandos Marine / Lorient

French naval components
Marines